The Story of Seasons video game series was originally produced by Victor Interactive Software (acquired by Marvelous Entertainment in 2002), with Natsume handling the English translation and distribution in North America. Story of Seasons is a series of farm simulation/role-playing video games where the main objective is to maintain a farm over a period of time, tending the crops and livestock throughout the seasons, while befriending the nearby townsfolk and getting married in some games. Story of Seasons titles have been released on numerous different video game consoles and handheld game consoles. Several titles have been re-released on multiple platforms as special editions which include an updated gameplay. Fourteen spin-off titles have been released, featuring related elements. One of these titles, Rune Factory: A Fantasy Harvest Moon, was released to mark the 10th anniversary of the Story of Seasons series. One reason the Story of Seasons series has remained popular is because of the unchanged core system of the games. According to Yasuhiro Wada, Story of Seasons lead designer, it has been the development team's response to the audience's requests which has allowed the series to maintain its popularity.

Due to Natsume keeping the rights to the Harvest Moon name when Marvelous decided to have their own American division, Xseed Games, take over North American distribution, the newer titles in the series had to be renamed to Story of Seasons while Natsume took the opportunity to start their own Harvest Moon series of similar games starting with Harvest Moon: The Lost Valley. This has reportedly caused some degree of confusion among players and fans of the series.

Main series

Related games
There are 14 spin-off games under the Harvest Moon series featuring related elements or characters.

See also

 Legend of the River King, a fishing-themed role-playing game series also developed by Marvelous.

References

External links

 Official Natsume website
 Official Marvelous Interactive website 

 
Lists of video games by franchise